The music of Taiwan reflects the diverse culture of Taiwanese people. Taiwan has undergone several economic, social, and political changes through its cultural history, and Taiwanese music reflects those issues in its way. The music of the country has adopted a mixed style. As a country rich in Chinese folk culture and with many indigenous tribes with their own distinct artistic identity, various folk music styles are appreciated in Taiwan. In addition, people in Taiwan highly appreciate various style of Western classical music and pop music. Taiwan is a major Mandopop hub.

Background
The Kuomintang-led Republic of China government arrived in Taiwan in 1949, a government that suppressed native Taiwanese culture and implemented Standard Chinese (Mandarin) as the official language. This political event has significant effects on the development of music in Taiwan in the 20th century as it resulted in a gap in the transition of the traditional music culture. In 1987, a revival of traditional culture began when the martial law declared by the government was lifted. (See Taiwanese localization movement.)

Instrumental music includes multiple genres, such as beiguan and nanguan. Nanguan originally hails from Quanzhou, while it is now most common in Lukang and is found across much of the island.

Taiwanese puppetry (hand-puppet theater) and Taiwanese opera, two genres of spectacle that are strongly related to music, are very popular, while the latter is often considered the only truly indigenous Han form of music still extant today.

Holo folk music is most common today on the Hengchun Peninsula in the southernmost part of the island, where performers sing accompanied by yueqin (moon lute), which is a type of two-stringed lute.  While the Hengchun yueqin plays only five tones, the pentatonic music can become diverse and complex when combined with the seven tones of Taiwanese Hokkien.  Famous folk singers include Chen Da and Yang Hsiuching.

Genres

Hakka
Taiwanese opera is popular among the Hakka, and has influenced the tea-picking opera genre.  The most distinctive form of Hakka music are mountain songs, or shan'ge, which are similar to Hengchun folk music. Bayin instrumental music is also popular.

Aboriginal music

Of the two broad divisions of Taiwanese aborigines, the plains-dwellers have been largely assimilated into Han culture, while the mountain-dwelling tribes remain distinct. The Amis, Bunun, Paiwan, Rukai and Tsou are known for their polyphonic vocals, of which each has a unique variety.

Once dying, aboriginal culture has undergone a renaissance since the late 20th century.  A full-time aboriginal radio station, "Ho-hi-yan" was launched in 2005 with the help of the Executive Yuan, to focus on issues of interest to the indigenous community. [Listen to Ho-hi-yan; requires Windows Media Player 9]. This came on the heels of a  "New wave of Indigenous Pop," as aboriginal artists such as A-mei (Puyuma tribe), Difang (Amis tribe), Pur-dur and Samingad (Puyuma) became international pop stars. Later artists include Paiwanese pop star Abao.

The 1991 formation of the Formosa Aboriginal Dance Troupe was another major contributor to this trend, while the surprise mainstream success of "Return to Innocence", the theme song to the 1996 Olympic Games, further popularized native musics.  "Return to Innocence" was made by Enigma, a popular musical project and sampled the voices of an elderly Amis couple,  Kuo Ying-nan and Kuo Hsiu-chu.  When the couple found out that their recording had become part of an international hit, they filed suit and, in 1999, settled out of court for an unidentified amount.

Bunun
The Bunun's original home was on Taiwan's west coast, in the central and northern plains, but some have more recently settled in the area around Taitung and Hualien.

Unlike the other indigenous peoples of Taiwan, the Bunun have very little dance music.  The best-studied element of traditional Bunun music is improvised polyphonic song.  Folk instruments include pestles, five-stringed zithers and the jaw harp.

In modern times, David Darling, an American cellist, created a project to combine cello and Bunun traditional music, resulting in an album titled Mudanin Kata.  The Bunun Cultural and Educational Foundation, founded in 1995, was the first organization established to help promote and sustain Taiwanese aboriginal culture.

Pop and rock
In the mid 1970s a genre of popular music known as Taiwanese campus folk song appeared in the music scene of Taiwan. This music consisted of a fusion of elements from American folk rock and Chinese folk music, and was very popular throughout East Asia. Until the 1987 lifting of martial law, Taiwanese pop fell into two distinct categories. Hokkien pop was sung in a native dialect and was popular among older and working-class listeners; it was strongly influenced by Japanese enka.  In contrast, Mandarin pop, due to the assimilation policy of the authoritarian Kuomintang regime (1945–1996) that suppressed Taiwanese languages and culture, appealed to younger listeners. Asian superstar Teresa Teng originated from Taiwan and enjoys immense popularity amongst the Sinophone world and beyond.

With the resurgence of interest in native cultural identities starting in the late 1980s, a more distinct and modern form of Taiwanese pop formed.  In 1989, a group of musicians called the Blacklist Studio released Song of Madness on Rock Records.  Blending hip hop, rock and other styles, the album focused on the issues concerning everyday, modern people.  Building on Song of Madness'  success, the following year saw Lin Chiang release Marching Forward, which kickstarted what became known as New Taiwanese Song.  Pop stars of the 1990s included Wu Bai, Chang Chen-yue, Jimmy Lin, Emil Wakin Chau (Zhoū Huájiàn) and so on. aMEI, who is renowned for her technically skilled and powerful vocals, is acclaimed to be the pop diva in Mandopop, and pop idols like Show Lo, Jay Chou, aMEI, Jolin Tsai and girl group S.H.E have now become the most famous and popular singers of Mandopop. For rock and band music, Mayday is said to have pioneered rock music in Taiwan for the generation of youth. For latest generation of pop music in Taiwan, singing reality shows such as One Million Star and Super idol have brought many ordinary people to fame, such as Jam Hsiao, Yoga Lin, Aska Yang, Lala Hsu, William Wei and so on.

The 1990s and early 2000s also saw the emergence of bands and artists of more diverse genres, such as Sodagreen, Deserts Chang, Cheer Chen, who have achieved commercial success and brought the new "indie" era of Taiwanese pop music. Other indie bands include Your Woman Sleep With Others, Labor Exchange Band, Chairman, Sugar Plum Ferry, deca joins, Backquarter, Fire EX, 8mm Sky, Seraphim, and ChthoniC.  The annual Formoz Festival, Spring Scream, and Hohaiyan Rock Festival are representative gatherings within Taiwan's indie scene. Of these, Formoz Festival is notable for its international draw, with foreign artists such as Yo La Tengo, Moby, Explosions in the Sky, and Caribou headlining the event, while Spring Scream is the largest local band event, and Hohaiyan draws a mixed crowd of beach side party-goers and music appreciators alike.

Other Taiwanese popular singers/bands include Rainie Yang, Da Mouth, Amber Kuo, A-Lin, Magic Power and much more. The popular culture of the Taiwanese people has also influenced Chinese-speaking populations in other places such as Mainland China, Malaysia and Singapore.

Metal

There are hundreds of metal bands active in Taiwan. Bands such as Chthonic and Seraphim have drawn more attention to the metal scene in Taiwan, with Chthonic in particular attracting attention overseas, performing at European festivals such as Bloodstock Open Air.

See also
 Bureau of Audiovisual and Music Industry Development
 Enka
 Hohaiyan Rock Festival
 Hsu Tsang-Houei
 J-pop
 List of best-selling albums in Taiwan
 Mandopop
 Metal bands of Taiwan
 Music of China
 Music of Hong Kong
 Red Envelope Club

References

Bibliography

External links
  Audio clips: Traditional music of Taiwan. Musée d'ethnographie de Genève. Accessed November 25, 2010.
 
 ISLAND OF SOUND: An Indie Music Resource for Taiwan
 GigGuide Taiwan: A Directory of Live Shows and Reviews of Local Independent Music in Taiwan
Pei-feng Chen, "Images of Multi-colonial Taiwan in Three Types of Enka: Self-reconstruction through Highlighting Differences in Similarities," Taiwan Historical Research, June 2008